Pounding the Pavement is the seventeenth studio album by Canadian heavy metal band Anvil. It was released on January 19, 2018, through Steamhammer.

Track listing

Personnel

Musicians
 Steve "Lips" Kudlow – vocals, guitars
 Robb Reiner – drums
 Chris "Christ" Robertson – bass, all vocals on 8, 10

References

2018 albums
Anvil (band) albums
SPV/Steamhammer albums